The imprest system is a form of financial accounting. The most common is petty cash. The basic characteristic of an imprest system is that a fixed amount is reserved, which after a certain period of time or when circumstances require, because money was spent, will be replenished. This replenishment will come from another account, for example petty cash may be replenished by cashing a cheque drawn on a bank account.

Petty cash imprest system
A petty cash imprest system allows only the replenishment of the spend made. So, if one starts the month with $100 in a petty cash float and spends $90 of it in that month, an amount of $90 will then be placed in the float to bring the balance back to $100. The replenishment is credited to the primary cash account, usually a bank account (Dr - Petty Cash a/c, Cr - Bank a/c) and the debits will go to the respective expenses account, based on the petty cash receipt dockets (Dr - Expense a/c, Cr - Petty Cash a/c).

Advantages
In this example the maximum amount of petty cash that can be issued (spent) is $100. The claimant may only spend what they have and is only replenished with what they spend, in this case $90.

In a non imprest system where a fixed amount is issued every month, e.g., $100 every time cash is required, there is no incentive to ensure all money issued has been documented because when money is all spent a check for a fixed amount is issued. It is much more difficult to reconcile a non imprest system as one never knows how much exactly should be in the float.

In an imprest system the amount requested is documented, the documentation being the petty cash dockets and their associated receipts or invoices. Therefore, at all times one can check how much should be left in the petty cash float by deducting the amount spent from the opening petty cash float.

How the petty cash imprest system works
The imprest system requires expenditure to be documented. In a petty cash system, receipts are written for each amount issued. So, when all of these receipts are totalled at the end of the month and deducted from the opening float, the calculated value must agree with what is left in the float. Under the imprest system, only that which is recorded as spent is replenished. Any shortfalls may need to be replenished by the guardian of the float, usually a bookkeeper, from their own personal resources.

References

Accounting systems
Credit
Cash